Nicolet-Yamaska is a former provincial electoral district in the Centre-du-Québec and Montérégie regions of Quebec, Canada that elected members to the National Assembly of Quebec.

As of its final election, it included the cities or municipalities of Pierreville, Nicolet, Bécancour, Sainte-Eulalie, Daveluyville, Saint-Leonard-d'Aston, Saint-Wenceslas and Saint-Gerard-Majella as well as portions of the city of Drummondville.

It was created for the 1973 election from parts of Nicolet and its final election was in 1976.  It disappeared in the 1981 election and Nicolet was recreated.  Nicolet disappeared again in the 1989 election, for which Nicolet-Yamaska was recreated. Nicolet-Yamaska's final election was in 2008.  It disappeared in the 2012 election and the successor electoral district was Nicolet-Bécancour.

Members of the National Assembly
Benjamin Faucher, Liberal (1973–1976)
Serge Fontaine, Union Nationale (1976–1981)
 did not exist (1981–1989), see Nicolet
Maurice Richard, Liberal (1989–1994)
Michel Morin, Parti Québécois (1994–2007)
Éric Dorion, Action démocratique (2007–2008)
Jean-Martin Aussant, Parti Québécois (2008–2011); Independent (2011); Option nationale (2011–2012)

Election results

References

External links
Information
 Elections Quebec

Election results
 Election results (National Assembly)
 Election results (Elections Quebec)

Maps
 2001 map (Flash)
2001–2011 changes (Flash)
1992–2001 changes (Flash)
 Electoral map of Centre-du-Québec region (as of 2001)
 Electoral map of Montérégie region (as of 2001)
 Quebec electoral map, 2001

Drummondville
Former provincial electoral districts of Quebec